Farm to Market Road 812 (FM 812) is a  state-maintained roadway located in Travis and Bastrop counties in the US State of Texas.

History 
Part of FM 812 was once known as the Austin-Port Lavaca Stagecoach Road.

The FM 812 designation was first used on August 26, 1948 for the road segment between SH 29 (along the current US 183 alignment) and Elroy.

Route description

FM 812 begins at an intersection with FM 20 just west of the community of Red Rock in western Bastrop County. From there, it proceeds northwest, passing through the community of Elroy, to its terminus at US 183, just south of Austin-Bergstrom International Airport in the community of Pilot Knob.

For a  segment east of Pilot Knob, FM 812 is concurrent with FM 973.

Major intersections

References

0812
Transportation in Bastrop County, Texas
Transportation in Travis County, Texas